The  is a hybrid diesel/battery Bo-Bo wheel arrangement shunting locomotive type operated by Japan Freight Railway Company (JR Freight) in Japan.
Following the delivery and evaluation of a prototype locomotive in March 2010, the first full-production locomotive entered service in February 2012.

Variants
 Class HD300-0: Standard type, entering service from February 2012
 Class HD300-500: Sub-class designed for operation in cold-climate conditions, delivered from November 2014
 Class HD300-900: Prototype locomotive delivered in March 2010

Design
The locomotives use lithium ion batteries, and are designed to reduce exhaust emissions by at least 30% to 40% and noise levels by at least 10 dB compared with existing Class DE10 diesel locomotives. Tests conducted at Tokyo Freight Terminal in June 2010 demonstrated fuel savings of 36%, NOx emission reductions of 62%, and noise level reductions of 22 dB compared with a class DE10 locomotive. Externally, the locomotives are finished in a bright red livery to aid visibility, with yellow and black diagonal warning stripes at the ends.

The first full-production locomotive, HD300-1, delivered in January 2012, while broadly identical to the prototype HD300-901 locomotive, incorporates a few minor improvements, including changes to the headlamps, a wider front-end warning panel to reduce snow build-up on the steps, and larger windows in the driving cab doors to improve visibility.

History

The prototype locomotive, HD300-901, was delivered from the Toshiba factory in Fuchū, Tokyo to Tokyo Freight Terminal on 30 March 2010 for approximately six months of trials before being moved to Matsumoto in Nagano Prefecture later in the year to assess performance at higher altitudes. The locomotive was moved to Sapporo Freight Terminal in Hokkaido in January 2011 to assess battery performance and adhesion in cold winter conditions.

The prototype locomotive entered revenue service from 11 July 2011, on shunting operations at Tokyo Freight Terminal.

The first full-production locomotive (numbered HD300-1) was delivered from the Toshiba factory in Fuchū, Tokyo, in January 2012, and entered service at Tokyo Freight Terminal from 8 February.

In May 2012, the Class HD300-900 prototype was awarded the 2012 Laurel Prize, presented annually by the Japan Railfan Club. A formal presentation ceremony was held at Tokyo Freight Terminal on 18 November 2012.

In November 2014, the first Class HD300-500 locomotive, HD300-501, designed for operations in cold-climate areas, was delivered to Naebo Depot in Hokkaido.

Fleet list

, 29 Class HD300 locomotives are in service.

Classification

The HD300 classification for this locomotive type is explained below. As with previous locomotive designs, the prototype is numbered HD300-901, with subsequent production locomotives numbered from HD300-1 onward.
 H - hybrid locomotive
 D - four driving axles
 300 - synchronous motors

Further reading

References

External links

 JR Freight press release announcing development in September 2008 
 Official press release from Toshiba (25 March 2010) 
 JR Freight HD300 (Japan Railfan Magazine) 

Diesel locomotives of Japan
HD300
Bo-Bo locomotives
1067 mm gauge locomotives of Japan
Railway locomotives introduced in 2010
Hybrid locomotives
Toshiba locomotives